Arnoldas is a Lithuanian masculine given name. Notable people with the name include:

 Arnoldas Burkovskis (born 1967), Lithuanian bank manager and politician
 Arnoldas Kulboka (born 1998),  Lithuanian profession basketball player
 Arnoldas Lukošius (born 1967), Lithuanian keyboardist

Lithuanian masculine given names